Reymerston is a village and former civil parish, now in the parish of Garvestone, Reymerston and Thuxton, in the Breckland district, in the county of Norfolk, England, six miles north west of Wymondham, six miles south east of Dereham, and a half mile south west of Thuxton. In 1931 the parish had a population of 220. The village retains a church, St. Peter, which has a weekly service and special events.
One of the village's residents was Wing Commander Ken Wallis, who lived at Reymerston Hall. He built autogyros and constructed "Little Nellie" for the James Bond film You Only Live Twice. On the 1st of April 1935 the parish was merged with Thuxton to form "Garveston"; later the parish was renamed to "Garvestone, Reymerston and Thuxton".

The village's name means "Raimar's farm/settlement".

The village is located just off the B1135 Wymondham to Dereham road, and is served by a station on the Mid-Norfolk Railway heritage line in Thuxton.  The railway station waiting rooms have been converted into holiday accommodation.

References 

http://kepn.nottingham.ac.uk/map/place/Norfolk/Reymerston

External links

Villages in Norfolk
Former civil parishes in Norfolk
Breckland District